Stellan Westerdahl (10 November 1935 – 27 August 2018) was a Swedish sailor. He won a silver medal in the star class at the 1972 Summer Olympics with Pelle Pettersson.

References

External links
 

1935 births
2018 deaths
Sportspeople from Gothenburg
Swedish male sailors (sport)
Olympic sailors of Sweden
Sailors at the 1972 Summer Olympics – Star
Olympic silver medalists for Sweden
Olympic medalists in sailing
Medalists at the 1972 Summer Olympics